This article is one of a series providing information about endemism among birds in the world's various zoogeographic zones. For an overview of this subject see Endemism in birds.

Patterns of endemism

Genus-level endemism

No bird families are endemic to the region; however, the following genera are endemic:

In addition in the following genera, high proportions of the member species are endemic to the region:

Endemic Bird Areas
Birdlife International has defined a number of Endemic Bird Areas and Secondary Areas in this region.

List of species

The following is a list of bird species endemic to the region of Mexico south to Nicaragua  (M indicates a species endemic to Mexico; G, Guatemala).

 M Rufous-bellied chachalaca
 M West Mexican chachalaca
 Highland guan
 M,G Horned guan EN 
 M Bearded wood-partridge
 M Long-tailed wood-partridge
 M Elegant quail
 M Banded quail
 Black-throated bobwhite
 Singing quail
 Ocellated quail
 Ocellated turkey
 M Aztec rail
 M Tuxtla quail-dove
 White-faced quail-dove
 M Socorro dove
 Lesser roadrunner
 M Balsas screech-owl
 M,G Bearded screech-owl
 M Tamaulipas pygmy-owl
 M Colima pygmy-owl
 Fulvous owl
 M Eared poorwill
 M Tawny-collared nightjar
 Yucatan nightjar
 M White-fronted swift
 M White-naped swift
 M Short-crested coquette
 Green-throated mountain-gem
 Green-breasted mountain-gem
 Amethyst-throated hummingbird
 Garnet-throated hummingbird
 Slender sheartail
 M Mexican sheartail
 Sparkling-tailed hummingbird
 M Beautiful hummingbird
 M Bumblebee hummingbird
 Wine-throated hummingbird
 M Golden-crowned emerald
 M Cozumel emerald
 M Dusky hummingbird
 Emerald-chinned hummingbird
 Wedge-tailed sabrewing
 M Long-tailed sabrewing
 Rufous sabrewing
 M Mexican woodnymph
 M Blue-capped hummingbird
 M White-tailed hummingbird
 White-bellied emerald
 Honduran emerald
 Azure-crowned hummingbird
 Berylline hummingbird
 M Green-fronted hummingbird
 M Xantus's hummingbird
 M Citreoline trogon
 Mountain trogon
 Blue-throated motmot
 M,G Russet-crowned motmot
 M Golden-cheeked woodpecker
 M Gray-breasted woodpecker
 Yucatan woodpecker
 M Strickland's woodpecker
 M Gray-crowned woodpecker
 M Red-crowned parrot
 M Lilac-crowned parrot
 Yellow-naped parrot
 Yellow-headed parrot
 Yellow-lored parrot
 M Mexican parrotlet
 M Thick-billed parrot
 M Maroon-fronted parrot
 Green parakeet
 Pacific parakeet
 Rose-bellied bunting
 Cozumel thrasher
 Cozumel vireo
 Sinaloa crow
 Tamaulipas crow
 Belted flycatcher
 Pileated flycatcher
 Slender-billed grackle
 Crimson-collared grosbeak
 Bushy-crested jay
 Dwarf jay
 Purplish-backed jay
 San Blas jay
 Tufted jay
 White-throated jay
 Guadalupe junco
 Blue-and-white mockingbird
 Socorro mockingbird CR
 Bar-winged oriole
 Rufous-collared robin
 Black-capped siskin
 Socorro wren
 Socorro mockingbird
 Black-chested sparrow
 Bridled sparrow
 Cinnamon-tailed sparrow
 Oaxaca sparrow
 Sierra Madre sparrow
 Black-capped swallow
 Green-striped brush finch
 Guerrero brush finch
 Azure-rumped tanager
 Rufous-backed robin
 White-throated towhee
 Yucatán vireo
 Pink-headed warbler
 Giant wren
 Gray-barred wren
 Nava's wren
 Rufous-browed wren
 Socorro wren
 M Yucatán wren
 Altamira yellowthroat
 Belding's yellowthroat
 Black-polled yellowthroat

The following is a list of species endemic to the region as breeding species:

 Black-vented shearwater
 Least storm-petrel
 Guadalupe murrelet
 Craveri's murrelet

The following is a list of species endemic to the region as non-breeding species:

The following restricted-range species are also found in the region:

 Colima warbler

The following are species which are near-endemics that also occur in the southwestern United States:

 Plain chachalaca
 Montezuma quail
 Black storm-petrel
 Ridgway's rail
 Scripps's murrelet
 Whiskered screech-owl
 Elf owl
 Buff-collared nightjar
 Mexican whip-poor-will
 Blue-throated hummingbird
 Lucifer hummingbird
 Broad-billed hummingbird
 Buff-bellied hummingbird
 Violet-crowned hummingbird
 Eared quetzal
 Gila woodpecker
 Golden-fronted woodpecker
 Ladder-backed woodpecker
 Arizona woodpecker
 Gilded flicker

The following are species which are near-endemics that also occur south to Costa Rica:

 Thicket tinamou
 Slaty-breasted tinamou
 White-bellied chachalaca
 Buffy-crowned wood-partridge
 Buffy-crowned wood-partridge
 Ruddy crake
 Lesser ground-cuckoo
 Pacific screech-owl
 Great swallow-tailed swift
 Black-crested coquette
 Plain-capped starthroat
 Canivet's emerald
 Blue-tailed hummingbird
 Cinnamon hummingbird
 Black-headed trogon
 Keel-billed motmot
 Turquoise-browed motmot
 Hoffmann's woodpecker
 White-fronted parrot
 Orange-fronted parakeet

The following extinct species were formerly endemic:

 G Atitlan grebe (last reported 1986)
 Guadalupe storm-petrel
 M Imperial woodpecker
 M Guadalupe caracara (last reported 1990)

References
"Data Zone". BirdLife International.

'e
'e
'central
Lists of birds of North America
Mexico and northern Central America
endemic birds of Mexico and Central America